The Clark House in Goodrich, North Dakota is a historic house built in 1901 that was listed on the National Register of Historic Places in 2013.

It is significant as the first residence built in Goodrich, which was platted in 1901, and as "a good example of Colonial Revival architecture and the best example of that style remaining in Goodrich."

Its walls are built of pressed concrete blocks, and it has wood fishscale shingles beneath its eaves.

References 

Colonial Revival architecture in North Dakota
Houses in Sheridan County, North Dakota
Houses completed in 1901
Houses on the National Register of Historic Places in North Dakota
National Register of Historic Places in Sheridan County, North Dakota
1901 establishments in North Dakota